Salvatore Burrai (born 26 May 1987) is an Italian professional footballer who plays as a midfielder for  club Pordenone.

Club career
Born in Sassari, Sardinia, Burrai started his career at Sardinian club Cagliari. He made his Serie A debut in the last round of 2006–07 Serie A.

He left for various Serie C1 clubs from 2007 to 2011, with Foggia also received half of the registration rights for a peppercorn fee of €500. In June 2011 Foggia bought Burrai and Marco Sau outright for €207,000. However, on 31 August 2011 they were bought back from Foggia, for €207,000 (Sau) and for free (Burrai). In January 2012 Burrai was signed by Latina, again in co-ownership deal for €500. In June 2012 Cagliari gave up the remain 50% registration rights.

On 31 August 2013, Burrai was signed by Serie B club Modena, with Alberto Massacci moved to Latina in temporary deal.

On 3 July 2014, Burrai was signed by Serie C club Monza in a three-year contract. On 22 December 2014 Burrai was released.

In January 2015 he was signed by Juve Stabia in a -year deal.

On 28 July, he was signed by S.S. Robur Siena on a free transfer.

In the summer of 2016 he moved to Pordenone.

On 9 September 2020 he went to Perugia.

On 15 July 2022, Burrai returned to Pordenone.

References

External links
 

1987 births
Living people
Association football midfielders
Italian footballers
Cagliari Calcio players
Manfredonia Calcio players
Ternana Calcio players
U.S. Cremonese players
Calcio Foggia 1920 players
Latina Calcio 1932 players
Modena F.C. players
A.C. Monza players
S.S. Juve Stabia players
A.C.N. Siena 1904 players
Pordenone Calcio players
A.C. Perugia Calcio players
Serie A players
Serie B players
Serie C players
Footballers from Sardinia